Apache Trail is a 1942 American Western film directed by Richard Thorpe, written by Maurice Geraghty, and starring Lloyd Nolan, Donna Reed, William Lundigan, Ann Ayars, Connie Gilchrist, and Chill Wills. The picture was released on June 24, 1942, by Metro-Goldwyn-Mayer.

Plot
Tom O'Folliard (William Lundigan) is released from jail and seeks work at his prior employer, a stagecoach line. He is sent to manage a stagecoach rest stop in a remote area. Upon arrival, he meets a woman, Señora Martinez (Connie Gilchrist) and her daughter Rosalia (Donna Reed) who cook and clean at the rest stop. When the next stage arrives, among its cargo is a strong box with cash. Soon after, Folliard's brother "Trigger" Bill Folliard (Lloyd Nolan), a known outlaw arrives and seeks shelter from the local Apaches, whom he has offended. Upon his discovery that a strong box is present, he plans to steal it and make a getaway.

During Tom Folliard's absence from the rest stop, Trigger Bill gets the upper hand on the stagecoach line employees watching him and tries to escape with the proceeds but is thwarted by his brother's arrival back at the rest stop. Soon thereafter, the Apaches attack the rest stop but are repulsed. They demand Trigger Bill and in return they will leave the rest stop alone. A vote is taken by all those in the rest stop with Tom casting the deciding vote to not give his brother to the Apaches. During the next attack Bill, previously expertly shot through both hands by his brother, elects in noble fashion to sacrifice himself to save the others by riding away from the rest stop. Meanwhile, Tom, after a brief flirtation with one of the stagecoach passengers, Constance Selden (Ann Ayars), tells Señora Martinez that he would like to court her daughter.

Cast 
 Lloyd Nolan as Trigger Bill Folliard
 Donna Reed as Rosalia Martinez
 William Lundigan as Tom O'Folliard
 Ann Ayars as Constance Selden
 Connie Gilchrist as Señora Martinez
 Chill Wills as 'Pike' Skelton
 Miles Mander as James V. Thorne
 Gloria Holden as Mrs. James V. Thorne
 Ray Teal as Ed Cotton
 Grant Withers as 'Les' Lestrade
 Fuzzy Knight as Juke
 Trevor Bardette as Amber
 Tito Renaldo as Cochee
 Frank M. Thomas as Maj. Lowden
 George Watts as Judge Keeley
 Mitchell Lewis as Bolt Saunders (uncredited)

References

External links 

 

1942 films
1940s English-language films
American Western (genre) films
1942 Western (genre) films
Metro-Goldwyn-Mayer films
Films directed by Richard Thorpe
American black-and-white films
Films scored by Sol Kaplan
1940s American films